Etoro may refer to:

 Etoro people, a tribe of Papua New Guinea
 Edolo language, their language
 eToro, an online foreign exchange trading platform